Bergenhus may refer to:
 Bergenhus, a borough of the city of Bergen, Norway
 Bergenhus Fortress, a fortress in the city of Bergen, Norway
 Bergenhus len, an abolished administrative division in Norway
 Søndre Bergenhus amt, which became Hordaland county (in Vestland county, Norway)
 Nordre Bergenhus amt, which became Sogn og Fjordane county (in Vestland county, Norway)
 Bergenhus Regiment, a Norwegian Army infantry regiment located in Hordaland and Sogn og Fjordane counties

See also
 Bergenhusen, a municipality in the district of Schleswig-Flensburg, in Schleswig-Holstein, Germany